Germán Yacaruso (born 6 January 1993) is an Argentine professional footballer who plays as a goalkeeper for Flandria.

Career
Yacaruso's senior career started in Primera B Metropolitana with Comunicaciones; after he joined the club from Vélez Sarsfield's youth ranks. His opening experience of first-team football was as an unused substitute for a Copa Argentina encounter with Atlanta in August 2015. He made his professional debut in September 2016, appearing for the full duration of a league draw with Deportivo Morón. Yacaruso made eighteen appearances in the 2016–17 Primera B Metropolitana, prior to participating in every minute of the club's subsequent 2017–18 campaign.

In July 2019, Yacaruso switched Argentina for Honduras after joining Platense. He made his debut on 12 August in a 3–0 victory over Vida, which was one of nine appearances the goalkeeper made for the Liga Nacional club. In August 2020, Yacaruso returned to his homeland with Flandria.

Career statistics
.

References

External links

1993 births
Living people
Place of birth missing (living people)
Argentine footballers
Association football goalkeepers
Argentine expatriate footballers
Expatriate footballers in Honduras
Argentine expatriate sportspeople in Honduras
Primera B Metropolitana players
Liga Nacional de Fútbol Profesional de Honduras players
Club Comunicaciones footballers
Platense F.C. players
Flandria footballers
Footballers from Buenos Aires